Nypan is a Norwegian surname. Notable people with the surname include:

 Lisbeth Nypan ( 1610–1670), alleged Norwegian witch
 Øyvind Nypan (born 1972), Norwegian guitarist 

Norwegian-language surnames